Elizabeth Finch, née Heneage, 1st Countess of Winchilsea (9 July 1556 – 23 March 1634) was an English peeress.

Early life 
Elizabeth was born on 9 July 1556. She was the daughter and heiress of Sir Thomas Heneage, who was Chancellor of the Duchy of Lancaster and Vice-Chamberlain of the Household in the latter years of the reign of Elizabeth I. Her mother was the former Anne Poyntz, daughter of Sir Nicholas Poyntz and Joan (née Berkeley) Poyntz.

After her mother's death in 1593, her father remarried to Mary Browne, Countess of Southampton on 2 May 1594.

Personal life
At sixteen years old, she was married to Moyle Finch (–1614) on 14 November 1572. Moyle was the eldest surviving son of Sir Thomas Finch and the brother of Henry Finch. Together, they were the parents of:

 Theophilius Finch (1573–1619), later 2nd Baronet.
 Lady Anne Finch (1574–1638), who married Sir William Twysden, 1st Baronet.
 Heneage Finch (b. 1576), who died young.
 Hon. Thomas Finch (1578–1639), later 2nd Earl of Winchilsea who married Cicely Wentworth, daughter of John Wentworth, MP.
 Hon. Sir Heneage Finch (1580–1631), later Speaker of the House of Commons.
 Hon. Francis Finch (b. ), a barrister.
 Lady Catherine Finch, who married Sir John Wentworth, 1st Baronet, of Gosfield (–1631).

Soon after their marriage, her husband became a politician, serving as a Member of Parliament for Weymouth between 1576 and 1584, for Kent in 1593 and for Winchelsea in 1601. He served as High Sheriff of Kent in 1596 and 1605.  He was knighted in 1584, and awarded a baronetcy in 1611. When Sir Moyle died in 1614, Elizabeth and her sons made considerable efforts to have the family's status elevated and almost nine years later, James I created her Viscountess Maidstone, with a remainder to her heirs male. In 1628, she was further elevated by Charles I as Countess of Winchilsea. On her death in 1634, her titles passed to her eldest surviving son, Sir Thomas (who had already inherited his elder brother's baronetcy in 1619).

Elizabeth and Sir Moyle are depicted in repose in a monument commemorating members of the Finch family, sculpted by Nicolas Stone . The piece was created after Sir Moyle's death during Elizabeth's lifetime, and is now displayed at the Victoria and Albert Museum, London. It was originally in the church of St Mary, Eastwell, Kent, which became a ruin in the 1950s and is now owned by the Friends of Friendless Churches.

Descendants
Through her son Heaneage, she was a grandmother of seven boys and four girls. One of her grandsons was Heneage Finch, 1st Earl of Nottingham. His daughter Anne married Edward Conway, Viscount Conway, and was a philosopher in the tradition of the Cambridge Platonists and an influence on Leibniz. His daughter Frances married Sir Clifford Clifton, MP.

References

External links
Monument to Sir Moyle Finch and to Elizabeth Countess of Winchilsea at the Victoria and Albert Museum

References
Burke's Peerage & Gentry

01
Hereditary peeresses created by James VI and I
Hereditary peeresses created by Charles I
1556 births
1634 deaths
Elizabeth
16th-century English women
English countesses
16th-century English nobility
17th-century English women
17th-century English nobility
Elizabeth
Wives of baronets
Wives of knights